Yulella natalensis is a genus of harvestmen in the family Triaenonychidae. It is monotypic, being represented by the single species, Yulella natalensis.

References

Harvestmen